Elections to Mansfield District Council were held on 3 May 2007. The whole council was up for election and no boundary changes were made.

After the election, the composition of the council was:
Labour 12
Conservative 1
Liberal Democrats 4
Others 29

Election result

References

2007 English local elections
2007
2000s in Nottinghamshire